The Springfield Acorns were a minor league American football team based in Springfield, Massachusetts. They began play in the Atlantic Coast Football League in 1963. The Acorns played their homes games in Pynchon Park.  Following the 1964 season, the Acorns relocated to Norfolk, Virginia and became the Neptunes.

Season-by-season

Notable players
James Traficant
Dan Henning

References

Defunct American football teams
American football teams in Massachusetts
1963 establishments in Massachusetts
1964 disestablishments in Massachusetts
American football teams established in 1963
American football teams disestablished in 1964
Sports teams in Springfield, Massachusetts